Breno Matosinhos Santos (born 5 December 1991) is a Brazilian professional footballer who plays as a forward.

Clubs
 Atlético Mineiro 2012
 Universidad de Concepción 2012
 Grêmio Novorizontino 2013
 Paulínia FC 2014

Honours
 Atlético Mineiro 2012 (Minas Gerais Championship)

External links
 
 
 

1991 births
Living people
Brazilian footballers
Association football forwards
Paulínia Futebol Clube players
Clube Atlético Mineiro players
Universidad de Concepción footballers
Chilean Primera División players
Brazilian expatriate footballers
Brazilian expatriate sportspeople in Chile
Expatriate footballers in Chile